Tiaraspis subtilis is the oldest known member of the arthrodire placoderm family Groenlandaspidae.  Its fossils are found from Early Devonian Germany, ranging from the Pragian epoch until the end of the Emsian.

References

Arthrodire genera
Placoderms of Europe